Aba Mansuri (also Romanized as Abā Manşūrī) is a village in Masabi Rural District, in the Central District of Sarayan County, South Khorasan Province, Iran. At the 2006 census, its population was 16, in 6 families.

References 

Populated places in Sarayan County